Rockmart Woman's Club is a historic building in Rockmart, Georgia. The club was organized in 1906 and became an affiliate of the Georgia Federation of Women's Clubs in 1913. In 1922, the club moved into the eponymous building designed by W. Roy Reece. It was added to the National Register of Historic Places In 1995. It is located on North Marble Street and is part of the Cedartown Waterworks-Woman's Building-Big Spring Park Historic District.

See also
National Register of Historic Places listings in Polk County, Georgia

References

Clubhouses on the National Register of Historic Places in Georgia (U.S. state)
Buildings and structures completed in 1922
Buildings and structures in Polk County, Georgia
National Register of Historic Places in Polk County, Georgia
Individually listed contributing properties to historic districts on the National Register in Georgia (U.S. state)
History of women in Georgia (U.S. state)
Women's clubs in the United States